was a Japanese noblewoman and high lady, a daughter of Soga no Iname, a high-ranking official. She was a consort of Emperor Kinmei of Japan. Among her offspring were Emperor Yōmei, Empress Suiko and Princess Ōtomo.

Issue
Soga no Kitashihime gave birth to seven sons and six girls:
Imperial Prince Oe or Ikebe (Emperor Yōmei); born 540 
Imperial Princess Ihane-hime or Ihakumo, Ise Virgin; had to resign her charge being convicted of intrigue with her half-brother Mubaragi
Imperial Prince Atori
Imperial Princess Nukatabe (Empress Suiko), born 553, died 626
Imperial Prince Maroko
Imperial Princess Ohoyake
Imperial Prince Iso no Kami Be (Imigako)
Imperial Prince Yamashiro
Imperial Princess Ohotomo or Ohomata; born about 560; married her nephew Oshisako no Hikohito no Oe, son of Bidatsu
Imperial Prince Sakurai
Imperial Princess Katano
Imperial Prince Tachibana Moto no Wakugo
Imperial Princess Toneri, born about 565; died 603; married to her nephew Tame Toyora, son of Yōmei

The exact year of her death is unclear, but in February 612 a large funeral was held and she was re-interred in Emperor Kinmei's tumulus.

Year of death unknown
Imperial House of Japan
Soga clan
People of Asuka-period Japan
Year of birth unknown